The 4th AIBA European 2004 Olympic Qualifying Tournament was held in Baku, Azerbaijan from April 27 to May 1, 2004 during the annual Chowdry Boxing Cup. Boxers finishing in the top two in each weight category earned a chance to compete at the 2004 Summer Olympics. Only the winner of the super heavyweight division (+ 91 kg) was guaranteed a place.

Medal winners

Qualified

Light Flyweight (– 48 kg)

Bantamweight (– 54 kg)

Lightweight (– 60 kg)

Welterweight (– 69 kg)

Light Heavyweight (– 81 kg)

Super Heavyweight (+ 91 kg)

See also
2004 European Amateur Boxing Championships
1st AIBA European 2004 Olympic Qualifying Tournament
2nd AIBA European 2004 Olympic Qualifying Tournament
3rd AIBA European 2004 Olympic Qualifying Tournament

References
amateur-boxing

European 4
2004 in Azerbaijan